The 1999 Skate Canada International was second event of six in the 1999–2000 ISU Grand Prix of Figure Skating, a senior-level international invitational competition series. It was held at the Harbour Station in Saint John, New Brunswick on November 4–7. Medals were awarded in the disciplines of men's singles, ladies' singles, pair skating, and ice dancing. Skaters earned points toward qualifying for the 1999–2000 Grand Prix Final.

Results

Men

Ladies

Pairs

Ice dancing

References

Skate Canada International, 1999
Skate Canada International
1999 in Canadian sports 
1999 in New Brunswick